Macraesthetica is a monotypic moth genus belonging to the subfamily Olethreutinae of the family Tortricidae. The genus was erected by Edward Meyrick in 1932. It contains only one species, Macraesthetica rubiginis, which is only known from the Hawaiian island of Oahu. The species was first described by Lord Walsingham in 1907.

See also
List of Tortricidae genera

References

External links
Tortricid.net

"Macraesthetica Meyrick, 1932 (Tortricidae: Olethreutinae: Eucosmini)". Tortricidae (Lepidoptera) of Hawaii.

Eucosmini
Endemic moths of Hawaii
Monotypic moth genera
Tortricidae genera